Georgios Papavasileiou (10 December 1930 – 12 March 2020) was a Greek middle-distance and steeplechase runner who competed in the 1956 Summer Olympics and in the 1960 Summer Olympics. He was named the 1955 Greek Athlete of the Year.

He won back-to-back steeplechase titles at the Mediterranean Games in 1955 and 1959. He also won the steeplechase event in the Balkan Athletics Championships seven times in a row from 1955 to 1961. In the Panhellenic Championships, Papavasileiou won the steeplechase event eleven times, also winning seven times in the 5,000 metres race, and six times in cross-country races.

Competition record

References

1930 births
2020 deaths
Greek male steeplechase runners
Greek male middle-distance runners
Olympic athletes of Greece
Athletes (track and field) at the 1956 Summer Olympics
Athletes (track and field) at the 1960 Summer Olympics
Mediterranean Games gold medalists for Greece
Mediterranean Games medalists in athletics
Athletes (track and field) at the 1955 Mediterranean Games
Athletes (track and field) at the 1959 Mediterranean Games
People from Thessaloniki (regional unit)
Sportspeople from Central Macedonia